is a Japanese tennis player.

Sato has a career high WTA singles ranking of 697 achieved on 28 June 2021. She also has a career high WTA doubles ranking of 524 achieved on 13 June 2022.

Sato has represented Japan at the Billie Jean King Cup, where she made her debut at the 2021 play-offs against Ukraine.

ITF Circuit finals

Singles: 1 (1 runner–ups)

Doubles: 3 (3 runner–ups)

References

External links

2002 births
Living people
Japanese female tennis players
Sportspeople from Saitama (city)
21st-century Japanese women